North American was a Great Lakes steamship built by the Great Lakes Engineering Works at Ecorse, Michigan, in 1913 for the Chicago, Duluth & Georgian Bay Transit Company. The vessel was launched on January 16, 1913, and was the older of two near-sister ships, the newer one being SS South American.

In 1923 the boilers were converted to burn oil.

In 1963, North American was sold to the Canadian Holiday Company of Erie, Pennsylvania. The company used her in cross-lake service between Erie and Port Dover, Ontario, Canada, for one year until she was retired in 1964. After being retired from service, North American was involved in purchasing deals of uncertain nature, and was finally sold at public auction to the Seafarers International Union of North America in 1967 for use as a training ship at Piney Point, Maryland.

While North American was in the North Atlantic Ocean under tow to Piney Point, she unexpectedly sank off Massachusetts on September 4, 1967, 25 nautical miles (29 miles; 46 km) northeast of Nantucket Light.

References

External links
 Marine Historical Society of Detroit: SS North American

Great Lakes ships
Shipwrecks of the Massachusetts coast
Passenger ships of the United States
1913 ships
Maritime incidents in 1967
Ships built in Ecorse, Michigan
Passenger ships of the Great Lakes